The All-Ireland Poc Fada Hurling & Camogie Championships is an annual tournament testing the skills of Ireland's best hurlers and camogie players. Poc Fada is Irish for "long puck". The championships are sponsored by Martin Donnelly (who has been a sponsor since 1996).

The All Ireland Poc Fada Finals have taken place on the Saturday of the Irish August Bank Holiday each year since 2005. In 2018 the All Ireland Hurling Championship was restructured, with the 2019 Finals taking place on Saturday 3 August.

The Senior Hurling Final starts at An Fhána Mór, Annaverna, County Louth. Competitors must puck (hit) a sliotar with a hurley to the top of Annaverna Mountain (An Céide), and onwards to Carn an Mhadaidh. After a short break they continue down to An Gabhlán, before finishing back at the start of the course. The whole course measures .

Tournaments

Seniors Final – An Corn Setanta (The Setanta Cup)

The 12 competitors competing in this category qualify as the 4 Provincial champions, the 4 Provincial runners-up, the current champion, the 2013 "All Star" goalkeeper and 2 invitationals. In the past competitors have come from USA, Europe and South Africa.

An Corn Setanta ("The Sliotar Cup") is awarded to the player who takes the lowest number of pucks. Ties are broken by the distance by which the player's last puck crosses the finish line.

Comórtas Beirte (Pairs) – An Corn Cualigne (The Cooley Cup) & An Corn Craobh Rua (The Red Branch Cup)

Shared between the pairing drawn prior to the competition as the Pair returning the fewest combined pucks for the course. Record holders still to be clarified! This competition has now been discontinued.

Camogie Final – (The Camogie Poc Fada Cup)

There are 7 competitors in the Ladies event, although if there is an invitational place/wildcard on offer there may be 8. Presently the current champion, the 4 Provincial qualifiers, a qualifier from Co. Louth and a qualifier from Co. Armagh, the latter 2 counties being the hosts. In the past, the invitational/wildcard has gone to the London Cumann.

The U16 Boys Final – An Corn Sean Og Mac Seáin (The Sean Og Mac Seáin Cup)

There are currently only 4 participants in this event, 1 from each of the 4 provincial qualifiers. If the situation occurs where the winner of the All Ireland final is eligible to compete at the same age group the following year he will be asked to return and defend his All Ireland title. To date this has happened twice when the 2011 Under 16 champion (Cillian Kiely of Offaly) successfully retained the All Ireland title in 2012. This feat was repeated by his brother Cathal, the 2016 champion, who also retained his title in 2017.

History
The tournament was founded in 1960 by Fr. Pól Mac Sheáin and the Naomh Moninne club based in Fatima, Dundalk, Louth, with the first All Ireland event taking place in 1961 Limerick man Vincent Godfrey the first winner, out of 16 hurlers invited. The competition went off the calendar after 1969 before returning in 1981 with 12 competitors.

The concept of the competition originates in the Irish legend of "Táin Bó Cuailgne" when Cúchulainn, who as the boy Setanta set out from his home at Dún Dealgan to the King's court at Emain Macha hitting his sliotar before him and running ahead to catch it.

In 2001 the Poc Fada was held at Dundalk Stadium (Dundalk Racecourse) due to foot-and-mouth disease on the Cooley Peninsula, doing two laps of the circuit (2 miles 880 yards / 4,023 metres). The 2005 tournament was won by Albert Shanahan of Limerick, with international soccer player Niall Quinn (who played for Dublin in the All-Ireland minor final of 1983) also competing.

Almost all of the winners have been from the traditional hurling counties, but Dinny Donnelly (Meath), Gerry Goodwin (Tyrone), Colin Byrne (Wicklow), Paul Dunne (Louth), Mary Henry (Westmeath), 2009 champion Gerry Fallon (Roscommon) and the 2010 champion Graham Clarke (Down) have been the exceptions. The record currently stands at 48 pucks (an average of 104 metres per puck), achieved by Brendan Cummins (Tipperary) in 2004. The current record for the Camogie course is held by Patricia Jackman of Waterford when in 2013 she completed the course in 27 pocs and 7 metres (over the end line). Traditionally the most successful competitors have generally been goalkeepers, owing to the need for goalkeepers to puck the ball far up the field in a game of hurling but increasingly there are more "outfield" Hurlers and Camogs out qualifying their goalkeeping contemporaries at county and provincial final level.

Poc Fada Hall of Fame

Roll of Honour

Poc Fada Seniors

§ short course 2001 – took place at the Dundalk Racecourse (two and a half-mile) due to foot-and-mouth disease.
§ Less mountainous course 2012 – The Senior Men's competition was played over the "Lower" course due to the prevailing weather conditions on Finals' Day. They started at the  course start line pucking to "An Gábhlan" and back to the start line where they turned and repeated the course for a second time.
§ short course 2021 – the women's/juvenile course was used due to heavy fog on the mountains.

Camogie Poc Fada since 2004

Uses a shorter course of just 2 stages from "An Fhana Mór" to "An Gabhlan" and back, a distance of 2.14 km (1.33 miles). The current record for the Camogie course is held by Patricia Jackman of Waterford when in 2013 she completed the course in 27 pocs and 7 metres (over the end line). Lyndsey Condell of Carlow's record stood from 2008 until 2013 when she completed the course in 28 pocs and 67 metres (over the end line) – Scoresheet not available online but has been verified. Catriona Daly (Galway) finishing 2nd to Patricia in 2013 with 28 pocs and 17.5m is in third place. Mary Henry of Westmeath in fourth place with 28 pocs and 4 metres (over the end line) in 2006.

Boys (Under 16)

Uses the same course as the Camogie finalists.

Girls U16 Camogie Poc Fada since 2015

Uses the same course as the Camogie finalists.

References

 An Poc Fada.net – The Poc Fada portal for News, History, Pictures and Results
 The Poc Fada on gaa.ie
 GAA Poc Fada

External links
 The Poc Fada on gaa.ie
 GAA Poc Fada on Facebook
 GAA Poc Fada on Twitter
 MD My Club Shop GAA Poc Fada Official Sponsor
 An Poc Fada.net – The Poc Fada portal for News, History, Pictures and Results

All-Ireland Hurling Championships